Jeffrey Graham Weston (born April 10, 1956) is an American former professional football Offensive tackle who played in the National Football League for the New York Giants from 1979 to 1982 for a total of 37 career games.

References

Living people
1956 births
Players of American football from New Jersey
Notre Dame Fighting Irish football players
New York Giants players